Bhupender Dhawan is an Indian weightlifter and coach. He has been coach in powerlifting and bodybuilding. Between 1994 and 2019, he coached the Indian powerlifting team and has also been the coach of the national bodybuilding squad. In 1997, he was awarded "the best coach & player" of the year 1996-97 by the then Chief Minister of Delhi Sahib Singh and in 2000, he was awarded the Dronacharya Award for Outstanding Coaches in Sports and Games, India's highest award in the field of coaching of sports and athletics, by the then president of India K. R. Narayanan. Dhawan was the first powerlifting coach to receive the Dronacharya Award. He was also awarded with the Hall of Fame by the World Powerlifting Union & British Power Lifting Federation in Birmingham, in 2017.

See also
List of National Sports Award recipients in non-Olympic sports

References

Living people
Recipients of the Dronacharya Award
Indian male weightlifters
Weightlifting coaches
Year of birth missing (living people)